The Setenil Award is a literary prize for the best short story book published in Spain. Convened annually since 2004 by the municipality of Molina de Segura in Murcia, it is one of the most prestigious in the country. As of 2018 it confers an economic endowment of €10,000, and the city council publishes a reprint of the winning work.

Each winner has a bench dedicated to him or her with a plaque in Molina de Segura's Paseo de Rosales.

In its 12th edition (2015), a micro-story book, written by Emilio Gavilanes, was awarded for the first time in the history of the contest. This recognized the strength and prestige of the microfiction genre.

Winners
 Alberto Méndez (2004)
  (2005)
 Cristina Fernández Cubas (2006)
 Sergi Pàmies (2007)
 Óscar Esquivias (2008)
  (2009)
  (2010)
 David Roas (2011)
 Clara Obligado (2012)
  (2013)
  (2014)
  (2015)
  (2016)
 Pedro Ugarte (2017)
 José Ovejero (2018)

Editions

References

External links
 

2004 establishments in Spain
Awards established in 2004
Spanish literary awards